{{DISPLAYTITLE:C8H6O3}}
The molecular formula C8H6O3 (molar mass: 150.13 g/mol) may refer to:

 2-Carboxybenzaldehyde
 4-Carboxybenzaldehyde
 Phenylglyoxylic_acid
 Piperonal

Molecular formulas